The 1972 NCAA University Division Men's Soccer Tournament was the fourteenth organized men's college soccer tournament by the National Collegiate Athletic Association, to determine the top University Division college soccer team in the United States. The Saint Louis Billikens won their ninth national title by defeating the UCLA Bruins in the championship game, 4–2. The final match was played on December 29, 1972, in Miami, Florida, at the Miami Orange Bowl for the second straight year.

The NCAA College Division Men's Soccer Championship (now known as Division II) was held for the first time in 1972.

Tournament

Final – Miami Orange Bowl, Miami, Florida

See also
NCAA College Division Men's Soccer Championship
1972 NCAA College Division Soccer Tournament

References 

Championship
NCAA Division I Men's Soccer Tournament seasons
NCAA
NCAA University Division Soccer Tournament
NCAA University Division Soccer Tournament
Soccer in Florida